Aaron Dhondt (born 18 December 1995) is a Belgian footballer who currently plays as a forward for KFC Mandel United.

Professional career
Dhondt transferred to Waasland-Beveren from KFC Izegem in the Belgian Third Division after he scored 11 goals in the 2015/2016 season. Dhondt made his professional debut in the last minute of a 0–0 tie of Waasland-Bevern with Genk on 7 February 2017.

On 31 January 2019, Dhondt joined KFC Mandel United.

References

External links
Dhondt RTBF Profile

1995 births
Living people
Belgian footballers
S.K. Beveren players
Belgian Pro League players
Association football forwards
Place of birth missing (living people)
Royal FC Mandel United players